Margareta Jacobsson (20 July 1929 – 27 January 2021) was a Swedish alpine skier. She competed in three events at the 1952 Winter Olympics.

References

External links
 

1929 births
2021 deaths
Swedish female alpine skiers
Olympic alpine skiers of Sweden
Alpine skiers at the 1952 Winter Olympics
People from Storuman Municipality
Sportspeople from Västerbotten County
20th-century Swedish women